Jorlian Abdiel Sánchez Judge (born 17 March 1996) is a Panamanian professional footballer who plays as a forward for Liga Nacional club Comunicaciones.

Club career

Sporting San Miguelito
Sánchez made his professional debut in the Liga Panameña de Fútbol. On January 14, 2017 playing his first game against Tauro F.C. ending in a 3-0 loss. Sánchez also became the top goalscorer of the 2017 Clausura LPF.

Leones Negros
Sánchez was signed on August 22, 2017 to an undisclosed amount. On his debut he scored one goal against Tampico Madero which ended in a 1-0 win.

International
He made his debut for Panama national football team on 16 November 2018 in a friendly against Honduras, as a starter.

References

External links
Jorlian Sánchez at Telemetro: SSM goalscorer

1996 births
Sportspeople from Colón, Panama
Living people
Panamanian footballers
Panama international footballers
Association football forwards
Sporting San Miguelito players
Leones Negros UdeG footballers
Liga Panameña de Fútbol players
Ascenso MX players
Panamanian expatriate footballers
Expatriate footballers in Mexico